José Ricardo Barbosa Ribeiro Drumond, commonly known as Zé Ricardo, is a Brazilian footballer who plays as a midfielder for América Mineiro.

Career
Zé Ricardo came through the youth ranks at América Mineiro, making his debut in the senior league as a late substitute in the last game of the 2017 Campeonato Brasileiro Série A against Santos.

Career statistics

Honours 
América Mineiro 
Campeonato Brasileiro - Série B: 2017

References

External links
 

1996 births
Living people
Sportspeople from Minas Gerais
Brazilian footballers
Association football midfielders
Campeonato Brasileiro Série A players
Campeonato Brasileiro Série B players
América Futebol Clube (MG) players